Saint Mark's Episcopal Church, which is located at 1625 Locust Street in Rittenhouse Square, Center City, Philadelphia, Pennsylvania, is an Episcopal church in the Anglo-Catholic tradition. It is part of the Diocese of Pennsylvania.

History

The church was founded in the mid-19th Century as part of the Tractarian Oxford Movement revival in the Anglican Church. The building was built by John Notman in the Gothic Revival style between 1847 and 1849, based on an original design by English architect Richard Cromwell Carpenter. The tower was designed by Notman, and completed in 1865 by George Hewitt. The Main entrance with polychromed figurers depicting "Christ in Majesty" are part of the portal designed by Milton Bennett Medary of the Zantzinger, Borie, and Medary firm in 1923. 

The Lady Chapel was designed by Cope and Stewardson in the late decorated Gothic style. It was built in 1900; the ceiling is the first known example in the US of a stone vault. Both construction of the chapel and its furnishings were donated by Rodman Wanamaker in memory of his late wife. Because of its architectural quality and significance, the building has been designated a National Historic Landmark (NHL).

The church contains several ornaments by Charles Eamer Kempe; the Lady Chapel was originally decorated entirely according to Kempe's designs. When it was later redecorated, the altar was moved to the head of the north aisle to become the St. John's Altar. The polychromed figures were moved throughout the church, while the original stained glass remains in place. 

The church also has several Kempe frontals, representing a significant proportion of the surviving embroideries from that firm, some of which are still in occasional use. The Lady Chapel now contains a world-renowned silver altar with nearly 150 individually sculpted saints and scenes from the life of the Virgin Mary.  It is humorously said of this altar that it is "The only place where one can worship both God and Mammon at the same time."

The tower is one of about fifty in North America hung for change ringing, with a ring of eight bells. The bells were cast by the Whitechapel Bell Foundry in London. The heavy four bells were cast in 1876 and the light four were cast in 1878. The bells were restored for change-ringing in 1999.

The Aeolian-Skinner pipe organ, op. 948 (built 1936-1937) at the front of the church was designed and voiced by G. Donald Harrison. It is an early example of Harrison's American Classic style. The church also contains a String Organ given by Rodman Wanamaker and installed by the Wanamaker Organ Shop. The Screen Organ, which resides in a handsomely carved case situated between the Choir and Lady Chapel, dates from the 1902 Austin organ, which was voiced by British organbuilder Carleton Michell.  In 2004 the Organ Historical Society rescinded its 1982 historical organ citation after the organ was expanded with digital voices and a new console built by Cornel Zimmer Organ Builders. 

During 2017 and 2018, the digital and all of the Zimmer pipe additions (except for the Trompette-en-chamade) in the rear gallery were removed and replaced with vintage Aeolian-Skinner pipework, chiefly from the 1956 organ of St. Thomas Church, Fifth Avenue, New York. The current organist and choirmaster is Robert McCormick, and Bryan Dunnewald is assistant organist and choirmaster; notable former organists and choirmasters at St. Mark's include Wesley A. Day, Donald Nally, Scott Dettra, Diane Meredith Belcher, and Matthew Glandorf.

In the summer of 2008, the Standing Committee of the Episcopal Diocese of Pennsylvania voted to allow Saint Mark's to adopt the Church of St. James the Less as a mission of St. Mark's. A middle school was opened on the property in September 2011.

The church maintains a daily Mass schedule, as well as running a food cupboard and soup kitchen. The Reverend Sean E. Mullen is the 14th Rector of the parish.

Leadership

Vestry 
The current vestry is composed of 12 members of the congregation.

Rectors
Joseph Pierre Bell Wilmer (1849-1861)
Edward Abiel Washburn (1862-1865)
Walter Mitchell (1866-1868)
Eugene Augustus Hoffman (1869-1879)
Isaac Lea Nicholson (1879-1891)
Alfred Garnett Mortimer (1891-1912)
Elliot White (1913-1920)
Frank Lawrence Vernon (1920-1944)
William H. Dunphy (1944-1951)
Emmett Parker Paige (1951-1971)
Michael Becker (1971-1981)
Charles Owen Moore (1982-1995)
Richard Alton (1997-2005)
Sean Mullen (2006-)

See also
Isaac Lea Nicholson
Frank L. Vernon
List of National Historic Landmarks in Philadelphia
National Register of Historic Places listings in Center City, Philadelphia

References

External links

Listing and photographs at the Historic American Buildings Survey
The bells
The Organ
Letter about St. Mark's bells controversy from Anglicans Online
Aerial photograph
Map
Mystery worshipper reports:
 http://ship-of-fools.com/Mystery/2000/229Mystery.html
 http://ship-of-fools.com/mystery/2007/1348.html
 http://ship-of-fools.com/mystery/2007/1361.html
Annual Reports and Year Books of St. Mark's Church (1870-1951)

St. Mark
Churches in Philadelphia
Gothic Revival church buildings in Pennsylvania
Properties of religious function on the National Register of Historic Places in Philadelphia
Churches completed in 1848
19th-century Episcopal church buildings
National Historic Landmarks in Pennsylvania
Rittenhouse Square, Philadelphia
Churches on the National Register of Historic Places in Pennsylvania
Anglo-Catholic church buildings in the United States